is a city located in Okayama Prefecture, Japan. The city was founded on April 1, 1952.  The municipal district also includes 31 outlying islands including seven inhabited islands in the Kasaoka Islands group.

As of February 28, 2017, the city has an estimated population of 50,160, with 22,446 households and a population density of 370 persons per km². The total area is 136.03 km².

Geography

Climate
Kasaoka has a humid subtropical climate (Köppen climate classification Cfa).

Demographics
Per Japanese census data, the population of Kasaoka in 2020 is 46,088 people. Kasaoka has been conducting censuses since 1950.

Landmarks and local cultural facilities
 Kasaoka is the location of a protected horseshoe crab breeding habitat and the city features a Horseshoe Crab Museum. 
 Chikkyo Art Museum
 In culinary terms, Kasaoka city is known for its abundance of sea food and a local specialty of chicken based ramen.

Crime and safety
The Asano-gumi yakuza syndicate is based in Kasaoka. The Asano-gumi is the only designated yakuza group based in Okayama Prefecture.

Sister cities
Kasaoka is twinned with:
  Ōda, Shimane, Japan
  Kota Bharu, Kelantan, Malaysia
  Mörbylånga, Sweden

References

External links 

 Kasaoka City official website 

Cities in Okayama Prefecture